Drepane punctata, commonly known as spotted sicklefish, is a fish native to the Indo-Pacific and northern Australia.

External links
 Fishes of Australia : Drepane punctata

Drepaneidae
Marine fish of Northern Australia
Fish described in 1758
Taxa named by Carl Linnaeus